The MATA Festival is a New York-based annual contemporary classical music festival devoted to championing the works of young composers. It was founded in 1996 by Philip Glass, Lisa Bielawa and Eleonor Sandresky and is currently under the leadership of executive director Amanda Gookin.

History 

Bielawa and Sandresky were part of Glass's touring ensemble in the early 1990s; during road tours, the three conceived of concerts that would serve as an outlet for unaffiliated composers. These concerts would later form the basis of the MATA festival. MATA's concerts were originally presented at the Anthology Film Archives, leading to its name: the acronym stands for "Music at the Anthology". Since then, the festival has been presented at various venues, such as Le Poisson Rouge, Roulette, and The Kitchen.

Past directors and employees of MATA include Yotam Haber. David T. Little, Missy Mazzoli, James Matheson, Christopher McIntyre, Todd Tarantino, Alex Weiser, Loren Loiacono, and founders Glass, Bielawa and Sandresky.

Commissioned composers
 2018 festival: Daniel Silliman, Erin Rogers, Jenna Lyle, Annie Gosfield, Jennifer Higdon, David T. Little, Nico Muhly, and Ken Ueno
2017 festival: Eric Wubbels, Kristina Wolfe, Siraseth Pantura-umporn
 2016 festival: Weijun Chen, Helen Papaioannou, Matthew Welch, Yair Klartag
 2015 festival: Ann Cleare, Adam de la Cour, Wang Lu
 2014 festival: Hikari Kiyama, Edward Hamel, Carolyn Chen
 2013 festival: Evan Antonellis, Bryan Jacobs, Jobina Tinnemans
 2012 festival: Francesco Filidei, Qin Yi, Huck Hodge
 2011 festival: Ryan Carter, Christopher Mayo, Angélica Negrón
 Interval 4.1 (2010): Timo Andres, Brett Banducci, Yotam Haber, Joseph Hallman, Ted Hearne, Andrew Norman, Paola Prestini, Chris Thile, Shara Worden
 2010 festival: Julian Day, Matthew Wright
 2009 festival: Andrew Hamilton, Nicole Lizee, Mike Vernusky
 2008 festival: Sean Griffin, Žibuoklė Martinaitytė, Micah Silver
 2007 festival: Yotam Haber, K-Kalna, Ned McGowan, Christopher Tignor
 Monster Composer Rally II (2005): Brian Heller, K-Kalna, Doug Opel, Charles Waters
 Monster Composer Rally I (2005): Randall Bauer, Alex Mincek, Vache Sharafyan

Critical acclaim 

MATA is consistently praised as one of the leading contemporary classical music festivals, and has been called "the city's leading showcase for vital new music by emerging composers” by the New Yorker, "the contemporary classical equivalent of the U.N. General Assembly” by the Village Voice and "inventive, stylistically nondogmatic" by the New York Times.

References

External links
 MATA Website

Classical music festivals in the United States
Contemporary classical music festivals
Music festivals in New York City